Sérine Hanaoui (born January 10, 1988, in Bouïra) is an Algerian international volleyball player.  She represented Algeria at the 2008 and 2012 Summer Olympics.  Her mother is a former volleyball player who played for the Algerian national team in the 1970s.

Club information
 Current club :  Hainaut
 Previous club :  Terville OC 
 Previous club :  Istres volleyball 
 Debut club :  Lyon volleyball

References

1988 births
Living people
People from Bouïra
Algerian women's volleyball players
Volleyball players at the 2008 Summer Olympics
Volleyball players at the 2012 Summer Olympics
Olympic volleyball players of Algeria
Competitors at the 2009 Mediterranean Games
Algerian expatriates in France
Setters (volleyball)
Expatriate volleyball players in France
Mediterranean Games competitors for Algeria
21st-century Algerian people